The Kwame Nkrumah Ideological Institute (officially known as the Kwame Nkrumah Institute of Economics and Political Science or Winneba ideological Institute) was an educational body in Winneba, founded to promote socialism in Ghana as well as the decolonization of Africa. During its construction, the first stone was laid by Kwame Nkrumah on 18 February 1961. The institute was designed to promote national independence, for almost all Ghanaians in the first Nkrumah government were trained in the United Kingdom or United States. The institute's Director was Kodwo Addison, a prominent Ghanaian activist.

Demographics
The vast majority of students came from Ghana. However, as a pan-Africanist institution, the institute also educated students from Nigeria, Senegal, and Somalia.

Enrollment figures
1962: 100
1963: 210
1964: 475
1965: 550

Notable related people
 Robert Mugabe
 Tibor Szamuely (historian)

References

Educational institutions established in 1961
Educational institutions disestablished in 1966
Ideological Institute
Schools in Ghana
1961 establishments in Ghana